Vernon Shelby Martin (January 5, 1932 – November 10, 2000) was an American jazz double bassist known for his work with Rahsaan Roland Kirk.

Discography
As sideman
1962: Domino - Rahsaan Roland Kirk
1968: Left & Right - Rahsaan Roland Kirk
1969: Volunteered Slavery - Rahsaan Roland Kirk
1970: Rahsaan Rahsaan - Rahsaan Roland Kirk

References

1932 births
2000 deaths
American jazz double-bassists
Male double-bassists
People from Toledo, Ohio
Jazz musicians from Ohio
20th-century double-bassists
20th-century American male musicians
American male jazz musicians